The University Park Historic District is a national historic district located in the town of University Park, Prince George's County, Maryland.  The district encompasses 1,149 contributing buildings and 2 contributing sites and is almost exclusively residential and developed as a middle-class, automobile suburb of Washington, D.C. The primary building type is the detached single-family dwelling, with the only non-residential buildings within the district and the town being two churches and the Town Hall, which is located in a former residence. Notable features within the district include the property's original plantation house, known as Bloomfield (Deakins House), and the nearby family cemetery. It was developed over the period 1920 to 1945, and houses are built in a range of popular early-20th-century architectural styles including Tudor and Mediterranean Revival, and varied interpretations of the Craftsman Aesthetic and the Colonial Revival, including interpretations of Dutch, Georgian, and Federal period substyles.

It was listed on the National Register of Historic Places in 1996, with a boundary increase in 2012.

Gallery

References

External links
, including photo in 2003, at Maryland Historical Trust website
Boundary Map of the University Park Historic District, Prince George's County, at Maryland Historical Trust

Historic districts in Prince George's County, Maryland
Colonial Revival architecture in Maryland
Tudor Revival architecture in Maryland
Spanish Revival architecture in Maryland
Houses on the National Register of Historic Places in Maryland
Houses in Prince George's County, Maryland
Historic districts on the National Register of Historic Places in Maryland
National Register of Historic Places in Prince George's County, Maryland